Corpus Christi Roman Catholic Church, Maiden Lane, is a Roman Catholic church in Maiden Lane, Covent Garden, in the Westminster City Council area of London, England. The church building, in Early English Gothic style, is grade II listed and was designed by F. H. Pownall; it was “specifically devoted to the adoration of the Blessed Sacrament.”

History 
The site was leased to the parish by the Duke of Bedford with the condition that the church should cost no less than £6,000; it actually cost £8,000. The foundation stone was laid in 1873, with the internal floor level three feet below pavement level to avoid the building being too tall. It was opened in 1874 by Cardinal Henry Manning, at that time the Archbishop of Westminster, and dedicated to Corpus Christi "as an act of reparation for the indignities offered to the Blessed Sacrament in this country in the sixteenth century and since". It was not consecrated until 1956 when the debt was finally cleared.

One of the early parish priests was Fr Francis Stanfield who wrote two famous hymns: 'Sweet Sacrament Divine' and 'O Sacred Heart'.

The church features in Graham Greene’s novel "The End of the Affair".

Interior
The main altar and reredos is by Thomas Earp, who may also have carved the altar in the Sacred Heart chapel. The statue of the Sacred Heart is a replacement in the recent restoration (2018).

The stained glass windows may be by Clayton and Bell while the blocked window in the south aisle is by Mayer.

The Lady Chapel, designed after the Holy House in Loreto, contains a statue of Our Lady of Walsingham which was installed and blessed by Bishop Alan Hopes of East Anglia in September 2015. The statue of Our Lady of Walsingham was carved specially for the chapel by studio Stuflesser in Italy. The stained glass in the Shrine Chapel shows the Coronation of the Virgin.

Near the sanctuary steps is a bronze statue of St Tarcisius, the Roman boy martyr, by Karin Jonzen.

There is a statue of St Genesius, a Roman martyr and patron saint of actors; the church has a long association with actors and is the spiritual home of the Catholic Stage Guild. It is also home to the Latin Mass Society.

Restoration
The church has undergone extensive renovation costing £1.5 million to remove the 1970s paint. It was re-opened by Cardinal Vincent Nichols, Archbishop of Westminster, in 2018, who dedicated the new Diocesan Shrine to the Blessed Sacrament. The new Stations of the Cross were sculpted by Arthur Fleischmann and donated in his memory by his widow. A new Sodaility in honour of the Blessed Sacrament has been set up at this church.

References

External links
 Official website

1874 establishments in England
Gothic Revival church buildings in London
Maiden Lane
Grade II* listed churches in the City of Westminster
Roman Catholic churches in the City of Westminster
Churches in the Roman Catholic Diocese of Westminster
Grade II* listed Roman Catholic churches in England
Roman Catholic churches completed in 1874
19th-century Roman Catholic church buildings in the United Kingdom